The Bandit Run is a reenactment of the journey portrayed in the 1977 film, Smokey and the Bandit.  The reenactment first took place on May 15, 2007, and has become an annual event.

The reenactment was the brainchild of David Hershey and Dave Hall who wanted to commemorate the 30-year anniversary of the classic film.  Hall, of the website, Restore a Muscle Car  and Hershey came up with the idea shortly after Hershey purchased his restored 1977 Pontiac Trans Am from him in 2006.

2007
Following the same route that the characters Bo "the Bandit" Darville (Burt Reynolds) and Cledus "the Snowman" Snow (Jerry Reed) made in the 1977 movie, a group of about 30 Trans Ams started out in Texarkana on May 15, 2007.  There, they had a send-off at the Classic Car Museum.  Both Texarkana mayors also got involved and gave a send-off speech to the group.  Heading east on the three-day trip, they were joined by Hot Rod Magazine and Automobile Magazine.  After an evening in Tupelo, the growing group of Bandit Runners received another send-off at the Tupelo Auto Museum on May 16.  From there, they headed toward Birmingham, Alabama.

There was a stop at the Talladega Superspeedway, where the Bandit Runners were given a tour of the museum, a group photo and lunch.  Then, a short drive brought them to their destination, the Year One Facility, for the annual Year One Experience, a three-day event.

The group in Atlanta totaled more than 100 Trans Ams and other cars. Local and national media was there to cover the event, and the Bandit Run was featured on Hot Rod TV and the DIY Network. To finish the weekend off, local Bandit Runner Tyler H gave the group a movie location tour around Atlanta, and visited some of the movie's most famous sites.

References

External links 
 Official The Bandit Run website
 On This Run, Way More Bandits Than Smokeys (but No Beer) at The New York Times, May 27, 2007
 The Bandit Run Photos

Automotive events
Smokey and the Bandit
Texarkana